The Children's Hospital and The Institute of Child Health, Multan, also known as Children Hospital Complex Multan, is a children's hospital located in Multan, Pakistan.

Accredited hospital
Children Hospital Complex, Multan is an accredited hospital by the College of Physicians and Surgeons of Pakistan.

Building
The building has two parts. The older part was constructed during the British Raj and the newer part was constructed in 2012. The old building was previously used as the Civil Hospital Multan. At that time, both hospitals operated in one building. Now, the whole of the old building, since 2004, and the new building are under Children Complex Multan.

Services
Hospital is a Tertiary Care Hospital. It provides following services:
 Pediatrics
 Pediatric Surgery
 Pediatrics Plastic Surgery
 Pediatrics Neurosurgery
 Radiology
 Pedriatic Urology
 Neonatology
 Nursery

References

External links 
Children Hospital Complex Multan, Official website - Archived

Hospitals in Multan
Children's hospitals
Hospitals in Punjab, Pakistan